Libby Burnham is the Chancellor of Acadia University in Nova Scotia, Canada. She is a legal and business advisor.

Burnham graduated from Acadia University in 1960. She earned  a law degree in 1963 from Dalhousie University.

References

Living people
Canadian university and college chancellors
Acadia University alumni
Schulich School of Law alumni
Dalhousie University alumni
Year of birth missing (living people)
Place of birth missing (living people)
Lawyers in Nova Scotia
Women academic administrators
Canadian women academics
Canadian women lawyers
Academic staff of Acadia University